Shaktoolik Airport  is a state-owned public-use airport located one nautical mile (1.8 km) northwest of the central business district of Shaktoolik, a city in the Nome Census Area of the U.S. state of Alaska.

Facilities 
It has one runway designated 14/32 with a 4,001 x 75 ft (1,220 x 23 m) gravel surface.

Airlines and destinations

References

External links 
 FAA Alaska airport diagram (GIF)
 

Airports in the Nome Census Area, Alaska